The Orphans is the fifth studio album by Kristeen Young. Its tracks "Kill The Father" and "London Cry" were released as singles in the UK by Sanctuary/Attack.

Track listing
"Kill The Father" – 4:09
"London Cry" – 4:36
"Mixed Kids" – 4:03
"(But It's All Just) Imagined" – 4:21
"You Ruined Everything" – 3:48
"Under a Landlocked Moon" – 3:43
"9" – 3:49
"Life's Not Short, It's Sooo Long" – 5:12
"This Is The Dawn Of My D-Day" – 3:35
"Dead Wrong" – 4:11
"Before" – 7:17

Singles
 Kill The Father w/ Life's Not Short It's Sooo Long (Sanctuary/Attack Records 2006, UK)
 London Cry w/ This Is The Dawn Of My D-Day (Sanctuary/Attack Records 2006, UK)

Musicians 
Kristeen Young: Vocals, keyboard
"Baby" Jeff White: Drums

References

Kristeen Young albums
2006 albums
Albums produced by Tony Visconti